Menlo is a small city in Chattooga County, Georgia, United States. The population was 474 at the 2010 census.

History

Menlo was platted in 1883. A post office called Menlo has been in operation since 1886. The Georgia General Assembly incorporated Menlo as a town in 1903.  The city's founder, Captain Andrew Lawrence, named it after Menlo Park, New Jersey, in honor of inventor Thomas Edison.

Geography

Menlo is located at the base of the Cumberland Plateau in western Chattooga County. It lies just over a mile east of the Alabama border. Georgia State Route 48 runs through the center of town, leading east  to Summerville, the Chattooga County seat, and northwest  to Cloudland atop Lookout Mountain. SR 337 leads northeast through the Broomtown Valley  to LaFayette.

Demographics

As of the census of 2000, there were 485 people, 229 households, and 141 families residing in the city. The racial makeup of the city was 96.49% White, 3.30% African American, and 0.21% from two or more races. Hispanic or Latino of any race were 0.41% of the population.

There were 229 households, out of which 23.6% had children under the age of 18 living with them, 47.6% were married couples living together, 10.0% had a female householder with no husband present, and 38.4% were non-families. 36.7% of all households were made up of individuals, and 22.7% had someone living alone who was 65 years of age or older.  The average household size was 2.12 and the average family size was 2.70.

In the city, the population was spread out, with 20.4% under the age of 18, 9.5% from 18 to 24, 21.4% from 25 to 44, 24.3% from 45 to 64, and 24.3% who were 65 years of age or older.  The median age was 44 years. For every 100 females, there were 85.1 males.  For every 100 females age 18 and over, there were 73.1 males.

The median income for a household in the city was $23,750, and the median income for a family was $32,143. Males had a median income of $25,417 versus $19,091 for females. The per capita income for the city was $12,994.  About 12.5% of families and 17.6% of the population were below the poverty line, including 18.1% of those under age 18 and 22.4% of those age 65 or over.

Commerce
The city lacks any major sources of commerce. The largest business is Best Glove, Inc., a medical and industrial glove supplier.

References

External links

Cities in Georgia (U.S. state)
Cities in Chattooga County, Georgia